Valérie Hayer (born 6 April 1986) is a French lawyer and politician of La République En Marche! (LREM) who was elected as a Member of the European Parliament in 2019.

Political career
In parliament, Hayer has since been serving on the Committee on Budgets. She is also her parliamentary group's coordinator on the committee. In 2020, she served as the Parliament's co-rapporteur (alongside José Manuel Fernandes) on a successful motion to assign new tax revenues to the budget of the European Union to repay its joint borrowing of 750 billion euros ($888 billion) for economic recovery after the COVID-19 pandemic. She is also part of the Parliament's negotiating team for the long-term EU budget (MFF) and own resources reform.

In addition to her committee assignments, Hayer is part of the Parliament's delegation for relations with the countries of Southeast Asia and the Association of Southeast Asian Nations (ASEAN). She is also a member of the European Internet Forum, the European Parliament Intergroup on Artificial Intelligence and Digital, the European Parliament Intergroup on LGBT Rights and the MEPs Against Cancer group.

In October 2021, Hayer and Marie-Pierre Vedrenne were appointed as co-chairs of President Emmanuel Macron's "Renaissance" electoral list in the European Parliament, replacing Stéphane Séjourné.

Hayer is also the president of the Association for European Revival, which is financed by LREM.

References

1986 births
Living people
La République En Marche! MEPs
MEPs for France 2019–2024
21st-century women MEPs for France